Paskaljević is a Serbian surname meaning "son of Paskal".

The surname may refer to:

 Bata Paskaljević (1923–2004), Serbian actor
 Goran Paskaljević (born 1947), Serbian film director

Serbian surnames